The Poincaré Medal (Médaille Poincaré) is a mathematics award from the Institut de France, Academie des Sciences, Fondation Henri Poincaré. The medal recognizes an eminent mathematician and is awarded only on exceptional occasions. It was established in 1914 and was eliminated in 1997 in favor of the Grande Médaille.

Recipients 

 1954 Georges Valiron
 1974 Pierre Deligne
 1992 John G. Thompson

See also 
 List of things named after Henri Poincaré
 List of mathematics awards

References 

 

Medals
French awards
Mathematics awards
1914 establishments in France
Awards established in 1914
Awards disestablished in 1997
1997 disestablishments in France